Old World Wisconsin is an open-air museum located near Eagle,  in Waukesha County, Wisconsin, United States. It depicts housing and the daily life of settlers in 19th-century Wisconsin, with separate areas representing the traditions of different ethnic groups who settled in the state. Costumed interpreters portray the occupations and chores of typical settlers of the time.

Overview
Opened in 1976, the museum is owned and operated by the Wisconsin Historical Society. The largest outdoor museum of rural life in the United States, it encompasses approximately 600 acres (2.4 km²) of rolling wooded hills. It contains more than 60 historic structures, ranging from ethnic farmsteads with furnished houses and rural outbuildings to an 1880s crossroads village with traditional small town institutions. A restaurant, gift shop, and conference space are located in the octagonal Clausing Barn. Trams run between the Scandinavian and German, African-American, and Crossroads villages.

History
Old World Wisconsin exists largely due to the efforts of German immigrant Hans Kuether and architect Richard W. E. Perrin. Perrin was an early advocate for the preservation of historic structures as evidenced by his involvement with the Association for the Preservation of Historic Buildings and with the preservation of the Mitchell-Rountree House in Platteville, Wisconsin in 1959. Perrin published a guide book in 1960 titled Historic Wisconsin Architecture listing 76 structures in Wisconsin that he felt were worthy of preservation. Perrin first proposed the idea for an outdoor museum in 1964 in the form of a "Pioneer Park". Perrin's inspiration for the park actually dated back to a trip he made to Europe in 1953 and visited European outdoor museums including Skansen in Sweden which he used as his model for the Wisconsin Park.

The effort to actually create the museum began in 1966, when the University of Wisconsin Department of Landscape Architucture and the Wisconsin Historical Society, agreed to have an undergraduate class at the university prepare preliminary plans for an outdoor museum. The proposals created were published in a report titled "Heritage Village, Wisconsin – A Preliminary Proposal". Following this, two graduate students were selected to refine and expand the preliminary programs through research, on-site investigations and design studies and create a master plan for development.  The study was co-funded by the College of Agricultural and Life Sciences and the State Historical Society at a cost of under $5,000. In 1968, the master plan was summarized in a 122-page report which also included an economic feasibility study by a graduate student in the School of Business.  The project was named Old World Wisconsin and the Heritage wording was later applied to the Heritage Hill State Historical Park near Green Bay, Wisconsin.

Fundraising for purchase of property estimated  at $30,000 were begun in January 1969. In June 1971 it was announced that the Wisconsin Department of Natural Resources would transfer about 560 acres of property that was then part of the Kettle Moraine State Forest to the State Historical Society for the museum.  Development costs were estimated at about $1.5 million at that time with about 20% of that coming from private donors.

Development of the park was intended to start in 1972 and the Historical Society had already moved 11 dismantled structures to the site but work was delayed until 1973 pending completion of an environmental impact study. A dispute arose in 1973 with the Town of Eagle.  The residents of the town were concerned about the impact the environmental impact statement revealed that the development of the museum would have on their town and the town board became concerned over lack of control by local zoning and building permits.  The board had directed the town's building inspector to post a stop-work order at the site.  The state filed a suit to vacate the order and $50,000 damages.  The town countersued for $5,000,000 claiming that newly passed state law required the state to follow local zoning ordinances.  The court lifted the order stating that work had started at the site before the law took effect on August 1 and was therefore exempt from the new rule.  The town did not give up on their lawsuit until November 1974.

The park was dedicated on June 8, 1974 with a flag-raising ceremony. At the time there were 8 structures completed or under construction.

In May 1975, the society reported that construction was still on schedule but that estimated costs had risen from $2.3 million to $4.5 million but that donations had only produced about $1 million.

In December 1975 Wisconsin Governor Patrick Lucey announced that a $4 million fund raising campaign would be chaired by Herbert Kohler Jr. and his wife Linda. The Kohler family already had a 45-year history of historic building construction and restoration through the Kohler Foundation dating back to the 1931 construction of the Waelderhaus and the 1950s restoration of the Sylvanus Wade House.

The queen of Denmark, Margrethe II dedicated the Danish exhibit on May 14, 1976.

The museum officially opened on June 30, 1976 in time for the United States Bicentennial celebration.

Tornado damage
On the evening of June 21, 2010, the museum was hit by a tornado that leveled acres of trees on the grounds. The "Old World 4th of July" event was canceled because of the clean-up efforts.

Villages

The park is divided into themed areas that represent typical settlement from various immigrant cultures.
African American: Pleasant Ridge Cemetery Chapel, Shepard Family Cemetery, United Brethren Church, Pleasant Ridge Cemetery
Danish: Pedersen Farm
Finnish: Rankinen Farm, Ketola Farm
German: Koepsel Farm, Schottler Farm, Schulz Farm
Christian Turck House was originally known as Schottler Farm. Both the Koepsel House and Christian Turck House are listed on the National Register of Historic Places. . 
Norwegian: Fossebrekke Farm, Kvaale Farm, Raspberry School
Polish: Kruza House
Yankee/1880s Village: Harmony Town Hall, Four Mile Inn, Sisel Shoe Shop,  Benson House, Grotelueschen Blacksmith Shop, Peterson Wagon Shop, Thomas General Store, Mary Hafford House, St. Peter's Church and a new exhibit added in 2014, Catch Wheel Fever 
Yankee Village also contains non-Yankee buildings featuring the integration of other European settlers to Wisconsin in the 19th century:
Sisel shoe shop (Czech) 
Grotelueschen Blacksmith Shop (German) 
Peterson Wagon Shop (Scandinavian)

List of structures

Three of the site's structures are listed on the National Register of Historic Places. Buildings were relocated from locations throughout Wisconsin.

References

External links

Old World Wisconsin website

1976 establishments in Wisconsin
Museums established in 1976
African-American history of Wisconsin
Czech-American culture in Wisconsin
Danish-American culture in Wisconsin
English-American history
Ethnic museums in Wisconsin
Finnish-American culture in Wisconsin
German-American culture in Wisconsin
History of Wisconsin
Houses in Waukesha County, Wisconsin
Museums in Waukesha County, Wisconsin
Norwegian-American culture in Wisconsin
Open-air museums in Wisconsin
Polish-American culture in Wisconsin
Rural history museums in the United States
Wisconsin Historical Society
European-American museums
Blacksmith shops